Toni: You Complete Me is the second studio album of Filipino TV host, actress-singer Toni Gonzaga and her debut album in Star Records, released in April 2006 in the Philippines in CD and release a repackaged album through digital download on iTunes and Amazon.com.

Background
Toni: You Complete Me includes 7 tracks with cover songs from Donna Cruz, The Cardigans and Dionne Warwick. The album includes her original composition "Kung Kaya Ko". and cover songs "Love Fool" of The Cardigans which is also from the soundtrack of the Baz Luhrmann's Hollywood film Romeo + Juliet and "Kapag Tumibok Ang Puso" originally done by Donna Cruz and also one of her favorite songs. The carrier single is "We Belong" composed by Christian Martinez. The repackaged album includes the acoustic cover of "Crazy For You" originally done by Madonna and the movie version of "You Are The One", a duet with Sam Milby. The album is awarded gold certified by the Philippine Association of the Record Industry (PARI).

Track listing

Toni: You Complete Me 

 track 1 “We Belong“ samples Hikaru Utada's “First Love“
 track 2 “You Are The One” is a remake of an original song by the Serenity band.
 track 5 “Wishin' And Hopin'” is a remake of an original song by Dionne Warwick.

Toni: You Complete Me (Repackaged) 

 track 1 "Crazy For You" is a remake of an original song by Madonna and was featured as the theme song of ABS-CBN's Crazy For You.
 track 2 “We Belong“ samples Hikaru Utada's "First Love".
 track 3 “You Are The One” is a remake of an original song by the Serenity band.
 track 5 “Wishin' And Hopin'” is a remake of an original song by Dionne Warwick.

Personnel
Credits taken from the album notes and Titik Pilipino
 Annabelle M. Regalado – executive producer
 Christian Martinez – producer
 Civ Fontanilla – album supervision
 Monina B. Quejano – album coordination
 Beth Faustino – music publishing coordination (Star Songs, Inc.)
 Peewee Apostol – music publishing coordination (Star Sogs, Inc.)
 Norman Albert V. Santiago – operations
 Nixon Sy – cover concept
 Jojie Mangabat – cover concept
 Andrew S. Castillo – cover lay-out & design
 Marlon Pecjo – photography
 Edwin Tan – stylist
 Jinky Illusorio – make-up
 Marlon Suarez – hair

Certifications

References

Star Music albums
2006 albums
Toni Gonzaga albums
Tagalog-language albums